The following are the national records in athletics in Namibia maintained by Namibia national athletics federation, Athletics Namibia (AN).

Outdoor

Key to tables:

+ = en route to a longer distance

h = hand timing

NWI = no wind information

A = affected by altitude

OT = oversized track (> 200m in circumference)

a = aided road course

Men

Women

Indoor

Men

Women

Notes

References
General
Namibian records 13 February 2016 updated
World Athletics Statistic Handbook 2022: National Outdoor Records
World Athletics Statistic Handbook 2022: National Indoor Records
Specific

External links
Athletics Namibia website

Namibia
Athletics
Records
Athletics